In the Groove is an album by Planet Drum, a percussion-based world music ensemble led by Mickey Hart, Zakir Hussain, Sikiru Adepoju, and Giovanni Hidalgo.  It was released on August 5, 2022.

According to music journalist Michael Broerman, "With Hart from the United States, Hussain from India, Hidalgo from Puerto Rico, and Adepoju from Nigeria, they represent a consortium of the top percussionists from around the globe, united by a common language of rhythm."

In the Groove is the fifth album by Planet Drum, following At the Edge (1990), Planet Drum (1991), Supralingua (1998), and Global Drum Project (2007).

Critical reception 
In Americana Highways David Nowels wrote, "The album continues Planet Drum's hypnotic trance-like exploration of music at its most primal. The Planet Drum ensemble have created an atmospheric sonic experience that is both uniquely organic and electronic."

Track listing 
"King Clave"
"Storm Drum"
"Tides"
"Drops"
"Phil Da Glass"
"Gadago Gadago"

Personnel 
Planet Drum
Mickey Hart – beats, bass beams (monochord), RAMU (Random Access Musical Universe), the beast (large cylinder drums), piccolo drums, V-Drums, MalletKAT, gamelan, glass bowls, thumb piano, conch, metal
Zakir Hussain – tabla, shakers, madal, dholak, balafon, vocals
Sikiru Adepoju – apala (talking drum)
Giovanni Hidalgo – congas, bahia, timbales, vocals
Additional musicians
Isaac Eady – drum set
Mañengue Hidalgo – congas
Melissa Hie – vocals, balafon, doum, djembe, metal, shekere, claps
Ophelia Hie – vocals, balafon, metal, shekere, claps
Edgardo "Kako" Maldanado – guiro
Baba Olatunje – vocals
Noel Rosado – bells
Jatinder Singh – Rajasthani folk vocals
India sessions – bass drum, duff, bottles and hi percussion, buckets, Pune dhol, vocal shouts, tabla, tasha, trash percussion, dimdi, ghumka, halgi, sambhal, sleigh bell, zanj, chondka, Nashik dhol, chenda, dholak, metal percussion, big ghungru, chimpta, dhol, matka, padhant, UduPune dhol, udu

Production
Produced by Mickey Hart, Zakir Hussain
Associate producer: Reya Hart
Mixing: Mickey Hart, Tom Lattanand, Zakir Hussain
Arrangements: Zakir Hussain, Mickey Hart, Tom Lattanand, Adam Tenenbaum
Recording engineers: Tom Lattanand, Moldover, Adam Tenenbaum, Michal Menert, Cherron Arens, Jerome Forney, Jonathan Koh, Bill Wolter, Jason Reed
Mastering: Michael Romanowski
Album art: Tim Bremner

References 

Mickey Hart albums
2022 albums